Scrobipalpa usingeri is a moth in the family Gelechiidae. It was described by Povolný in 1969. It is found in Saudi Arabia, Israel, Palestine, Mongolia and southern Russia.

References

Scrobipalpa
Moths described in 1969
Taxa named by Dalibor Povolný